Rome-Jayden Owusu-Oduro (born 2 July 2004) is a Dutch footballer who plays for Jong AZ as a goalkeeper.

Career
He moved from DVC Buiksloot to the AZ Alkmaar academy, beginning to play for AZ at under-12 level. After continuing through the age group levels he signed his first professional contract on 2 October 2020 keeping him at AZ until the end of the 2022–23 season. He distinguished himself with critical saves as the AZ under-18 side won a league and cup double in the 2021–22 season. He made his Eerste Divisie debut on the 26 August 2022 away against FC Eindhoven.

He has been wildly tipped as a "wonderkid" in the football management computer game Football Manager by the likes of Goal (website), SPORTbible, and Planet Football in 2022.

Personal life
Dutch born, he has Ghanaian roots.

References

External links
 

Living people
2004 births
Dutch footballers
Eerste Divisie players